Gopuff is an American consumer goods and food delivery company headquartered in Philadelphia. The company operates in over 650 US cities through approximately 500 microfulfillment centers as of October 2021. It also operates in the United Kingdom, following a take over of Newcastle upon Tyne-based Fancy. As of July 2021, the company was valued at $15 billion.

History

Gopuff is headquartered in Philadelphia, Pennsylvania, and was founded in 2013 by two Drexel University students: Yakir Gola and Rafael Ilishayev. Gopuff was originally an on-demand hookah delivery service but expanded to delivering food and goods typically sold in convenience stores. The company began offering delivery services in Philadelphia before moving into other cities, including Seattle, Boston, Phoenix, and Atlanta.

In 2016, Gopuff raised $8.25 million in A round funding. In 2019, the company reportedly raised $750 million in funding from SoftBank, with a commitment for up to $250 million more. Also in 2019, Gopuff opened a new headquarters in the Finnigan's Wake building in Northern Liberties.

Gola and Ilishayev were included in a 2017 Forbes 30 Under 30 list for retail and ecommerce and later in the year, were together named Target Magazine's target marketer of the year. While founding Gopuff, Gola and Ilishayev bonded over their similar ancestries and family backgrounds, and later became supporters of Drexel's Jewish community, providing funding for Drexel Chabad to purchase a new building in 2020.

In October 2020, the company announced that it had raised $380 million in a funding round led by Accel and D1 Capital Partners, bringing the company's total value to $3.9 billion. In November, Gopuff agreed to purchase BevMo! for $350 million. The alcoholic beverage chain has 161 stores in California, Washington and Arizona.

In March 2021, Gopuff announced that it had raised $1.15 billion in funding from investors including D1 Capital Partners, Fidelity Management and Research Company and Luxor Capital. That month, it was listed on CNBC's Disruptor 50 list.

In April 2021, Gopuff added the first independent board member, Betsy Atkins, to its board.

In May 2021, Gopuff acquired Fancy, a UK-based food delivery service. Also in May, Gopuff and Uber Eats announced a partnership to sell products from Gopuff through the Uber Eats app.

In June 2021, Gopuff acquired Liquor Barn, an alcoholic beverage chain, and announced the acquisition of RideOS for $115 million.

In February 2022, Gopuff signed a partnership deal with McLaren for the 2022 Formula One season.

In July 2022, Gopuff announced closure of 76 of its U.S. warehouses and layoffs impacting about 1,500 employees. The company still intends to expand services at other high-performing locations. In October 2022, the company conducted more layoffs, firing some 250 employees.

Services and operation 
Gopuff primarily delivers goods typically found in convenience stores such as snacks, drinks, household items, toiletries as well as pet and baby products like diapers. Beer, wine, and spirits are available for delivery in some markets.

In December 2015, Gopuff launched a beer delivery service called goBeer. In May 2016, they launched an alcohol delivery service called goBooze. These services are organized under the umbrella of goBrands Inc.

The company owns warehouses that stock many of the products it delivers, including electronics, food, medications, and pet supplies.

Controversy
In 2018, researchers from Northeastern University found that the Gopuff mobile app recorded user interactions that involved personal information, and transmitted the resulting video to a website affiliated with analytics company Appsee. Appsee criticized Gopuff for violating its terms of service. Gopuff stated that it would remove Appsee code from future versions of its iOS and Android apps, and amend its privacy policy to disclose possible data transfer to the app.

References

Bibliography

External links 
 

Online grocers
Online food ordering
Online food retailers of the United States
American companies established in 2013
Retail companies established in 2013
Transport companies established in 2013
Internet properties established in 2013
Companies based in Philadelphia
2013 establishments in Pennsylvania